Boom method (aka Boom nucleic acid extraction method) is a solid phase extraction method for isolating nucleic acid from a biological sample. This method is characterized by "absorbing the nucleic acids (NA) to the silica beads".

Overview 
Boom method (Boom nucleic acid extraction method)
is a solid phase extraction method for "isolating nucleic acid (NA)
from biological samples. Essential of this method is the use of silica beads, capable of binding the NA in the presence of a chaotropic substance according to the effect.
This method is one of the most widespread methods for isolating nucleic acids from biological samples and is known as a simple, rapid, and reliable method for the small-scale purification of NA from biological sample.

This method is said to have been developed and invented by Willem R. Boom et al. around 1990.
However, the aforementioned chaotropic effect itself was already known and already reported by Vogelstein and Gillespie before the development of the BOOM method.
So the contribution of Boom et al. may be the optimization of the method to complex starting materials, such as body fluids and other biological starting materials, and provides a short step procedure according to the Boom et al. US5234809. After the Boom et al. was filed,
similar applications have also been filed by other parties.

In a narrow sense, the word "silica" meant SiO2 crystals; however, other forms of silica particles are available.
Especially amorphous silicon oxide and glass powder, alkylsilica, aluminum silicate (zeolite), or,  activated
silica with -NH2, are suitable as nucleic acid binding solid phase material according to this method.
Today, the embodyments of Boom method, characterized by "utilizing the magnetic beads (silica beads are magnetic beads)" is widely used. In such method, silica beads are captured by magnetic beads collector, such as Tajima pipette, Pick pen(R),
Quad Pole collector, and so on.

Brief procedure

The process for isolating nucleic acid from starting material of Boom method are essentially consist of following 4 steps (See Fig. 1).

(a) Lysing and/or Homogenizing the starting material.
Lysate of starting material is obtained by for example a detergent
in the presence of protein degrading enzymes.

(b) Mixing chaotropic substance and silica beads into the starting material.
Mixing the Starting material, a chaotropic substance to bind the NA to silica beads, lysate of starting material of (a)  is mixed with sufficiently large amounts of chaotropic substance.
According to the chaotropic effect, releasing-NA will be bound to
the silica beads almost instantaneously. In this way, silica-nucleic
acid complexes are formed. The reasons why NA and silica form
bonds are to be described in the following section (Basic principles).

(c) Washing silica beads 
In this step, silica beads of (b) are washed several times to remove contaminants.
Process of washing of the silica-nucleic acid complexes (silica beads) typically consists of following steps,
 Collecting silica beads from the liquid by for example Tajima pipette (see Fig. 1,2) or by for example Pellet-down (by rapid sedimentation (centrifugation) and disposal of the supernatant (e.g., bysuction))
 Redispersioning silica beads into the chaotropic salt-containing washing buffer using, e. g., a vortex mixer.
 Collecting redispersed silica beads from above mentioned washing buffer again.
 Further washed successively with an alcohol-water solution and with acetone.
 Beads will preferably be dried.

(d) Separating the bonded nucleic acids 
Separating the bonded nucleic acids from the silica beads. Pure NA are eluted into buffer by decreasing the concentration of chaotropic substance.
NA presented in the washed (and preferably dried) silica-nucleic
acid complexes is eluted into elution buffer such as TE buffer,
aqua bidest, ... , and so on. The selection of the elution buffer is
co-determined by the contemplated use of the isolated NA.

In this way, pure NA are isolated from the starting material.

By the alteration of the experimental condition, especially by alteration of the composition of reagents (chaotropic substance, wash buffer, and so on) we can realize more specific isolation. For example, some composition of reagents are suitable for obtaining long ds DNA, some composition of reagents are suitable for short ss RNA, and so on.

Starting material are for example, whole blood, blood serum, buffy coat, urine, feces, cerebrospinal fluid, sperm, saliva, tissues, cell cultures, food products, vaccines. and..., so various Starting biological material are available.

Of cause optimization of procedure according to the starting material, species of desired nucleic acid (DNA/RNA, Linear/ circular, ds/ss, long/short) are required.

Today, the assay characterized by using silica coated magnetic beads seems to be the most common. Therefore, in this article, "silica beads" are intended to mean silica coated magnetic beads unless stated otherwise.

Magnetic beads
The silica coated beads coated various magnetic particles (magnetic carrier) with silica
are often used.
Maghemite particle (γ-Fe2O3) and magnetite particle (Fe3O4),
as well as an intermediate iron oxide particle thereof, are most suitable
as magnetic carrier.

Generally, the quality of the magnetic beads are characterized by
following parameters:
 saturation magnetization (～10-80 A m2/kg (emu/g):Superparamagnetic),
 coercive force (～ 0.80-15.92 kA/m),
 size diameter (～ 0.1-0.5 μm),
 mass of each particle (～ 2.7 ng),
 ease of collection (to be mentioned later),
 capture ability (to be mentioned later),
 Sedimentation rate (～4% in 30 min),
 Area ratio (> 100 m2/g),
 Effective density (～ 2.5 g/cm3), and
 Particle counts (～ 1 x 108 particles/mg).

Here, "ease of collection" is defined and compared by"magnetic beads are collected by not less than X wt % (～90wt %) within T seconds(～ 3 seconds) in the presence of a magnetic field of Y gauss (～3000 gauss) when it is dispersed in an amount of at least Z mg (～20 mg) in W mL (～1 mL) of an aqueous solution of a sample containing a biological substance"  and, capture ability are defined and compared by"binding with at least A μg (～0.4μg) of the biological substance per B mg (～1 mg) thereof
when it is dispersed in an amount of at least Z mg (～20 mg) in W mL (～1 mL) of an aqueous solution of a sample containing a biological substance".

Basic principles
The principle of this method is based on the nucleic acid-binding properties of silica particles or diatoms in the presence of this chaotropic agent, which are according to the chaotropic effect.

Put simply, the chaotropic effect is where a chaotropic anion in an aqueous solution disturbs the structure of water, and weakens the hydrophobic interaction.

In a broad sense, "chaotropic agent" stands for any substance
capable of altering the secondary, tertiary and/or quaternary
structure of proteins and nucleic acids, but leaving at least the
primary structure intact.

Aqueous solution of chaotropic salt is a chaotropic agent. Chaotropic anion increase the entropy of the system by interfering with inter molecular interactions mediated by non-covalent forces such as hydrogen bonds, van der Waals forces, and hydrophobic effects.
Examples thereof are aqueous solution of:
thiocyanate ion, iodine ion, perchlorate ion,
nitrate ion, bromine ion,
chlorine ion, acetate ion, fluorine ion, and
sulfate ion, or mutual combinations therewith.
According to the original method of Boom method, the chaotropic
guanidinium salt employed IS preferably guanidinium
thiocyanate (GuSCN).

According to the chaotropic effect,
in the presence of the chaotropic agent, hydration water of NA are taken from the phosphodiester bond of the phosphate group of the skeleton of a NA. Thereby, the phosphate group becomes "exposed" and hydrophobic interaction between silica and exposed phosphate group are formed.

Automated instruments

Tajima pipette
Nucleic acid extraction apparatus based on the Tajima pipette (see Fig. 2) are one of the most widespread instruments to perform the Boom method.

The Tajima pipette was invented by Hideji Tajima, founder and president of
Precision System Sciences (PSS) Inc., a Japanese manufacturer of precision and measuring instruments.
Tajima pipette is a Core Technology of PSS Inc.
PSS Inc. provides OEM product based on this technology (for example MagNA Pure(R) )
for several leading reagent manufacturers such as Hoffmann-La Roche, Life Technologies, ... and so on.
After Tajima et al. was filed, similar applications such as have also been filed by other parties.

The Tajima pipette performs magnetic particle control method and procedure, which can separate magnetic particles combined with a target substance from the liquid by magnetic force and suspend them in a liquid.

Configurations
The pipette itself is an apparatus comprising following members (see Fig. 2).
 pipette tip configured to be able to access and aspirate/discharge liquid from/into each of vessels, having
a front end portion,
a reservoir portion,
a liquid passage
connecting the front end portion and the reservoir portion,
a separation region
in the liquid passage subjected to an action of a magnetic field, and
a mechanism
for applying a negative or positive pressure to the interior of the pipette portion to draw or discharge a magnetic substance suspended liquid into or from the pipette portion
magnetic field Source
arranged on the outside of and adjacent to pipette tip; and
magnetic field source driving device
for driving the magnetic field source to apply or remove a magnetic field to or from the separation region from outside the liquid passage. When the magnet is brought close to the pipette tip, a magnetic field is applied; when retracted away from the pipette tip, that magnetic field is removed.

A nucleic acid extraction apparatus incorporating Tajima pipettes typically consists of:
Above mentioned Tajima pipette,
Plurality of tubes.
 Plurality of tube holder for above mentioned tubes,
Transport mean
to transport Tajima pipette among that plurality of tubes (tubes are supported by tube holder), and
Control device
for controlling abovementioned devices.

Motions
(a) Capturing of the magnetic beads.
During this suction process,
when the magnetic field are applied to the separation region of piper tip, from outside of pipette tip, by the magnet arranged on the outside of the pipette tip,
as liquid containing magnetic beads passes through a separation region of the pipette tip,
the magnetic particles are attracted to and arrested to the inner wall of tile separation region of pipette tip.

Subsequently, when that solution are discharged under the conditions of has been kept the magnetic field,
magnetic particles only are left in the inside of pipette tip.
In this way magnetic particles are separated from liquid.

In accordance with Tajima,
the preferable suction height of the mixture liquid is such that
the bottom level of the liquid is higher than the lower end of the separation region of the liquid passage  (That means bottom level of the liquid is higher than the lower end of the magnet.),
when all the mixture liquid is drawn up,
so as to ensure that the aspirated magnetic particles can be completely arrested.

At this time, because the magnetic particles are wet, they stay attached to the inner surface of the
separation region of the liquid passage of the pipette tip. If the pipette tip P is moved or
transported, the magnetic particles will not come off easily.

(b) Re-suspension of the captured magnetic beads.

After the magnetic particles are arrested by above mentioned manner (a),
so the mixture liquid removed of the magnetic particles is discharged into the liquid accommodating portion (Vessel) and drained out, with only the magnetic particles remaining in the pipette tip,
we can do the re-suspension process.

Re-suspension of the captured magnetic beads are in detail, consists of the following steps.
Of cause, we consider that, the state in which that magnetic material has been captured
by above mention way.
Aspirate liquid such as washing buffer into the tip
Quit the application of a magnetic field
By "Quit the application of a magnetic field" the magnetic particles are suspended in the liquid.
Discharging the liquid (such as washing buffer) from pipette tip to vessel (in the condition of magnetic force generated by the magnet body is cut off.).

Operations
An example of the operations of the nucleic acid extraction apparatus which incorporates
Tajima pipette are typically as shown in Fig. 1.

Other methods
Examples of other type of method of the magnetic particle capturing device are as follows.
 Pen type capture
 Tube type capture

See also
Chaotropic agent
DNA extraction
DNA separation by silica adsorption
Ethanol precipitation
Minicolumn purification
Nucleic acid methods
Phenol-chloroform extraction
RNA extraction

Notes

References 

Molecular biology
Laboratory techniques
DNA
Polymerase chain reaction